Royal Saxon Jagdstaffel 22 was a "hunting group" (i.e., fighter squadron) of the Luftstreitkräfte, the air arm of the Imperial German Army during World War I. As one of the original German fighter squadrons, the unit would score 57 verified aerial victories. Their eleven wins over enemy observation balloons made them a balloon buster squadron.

In turn, their casualties for the war would amount to five pilots killed in action, four killed in midair crashes, one killed in another flying accident, two wounded in action, and two taken prisoner of war.

History

Royal Saxon Jagdstaffel 22 was authorized on 25 October 1916; it formed on 16 November 1916.  Its genesis was in the 7 Armee area, and its original personnel came from two field flier detachments, FF(A) 11 and FF(A) 29, and an artillery cooperation unit, FA(A) 222. It mobilized on 1 December 1916. First victory for the new unit is debatable; Leutnant Gustav Rose posted a claim for 27 December 1916, but Josef Jacobs was credited with downing a Caudron on 23 January 1917. Jasta 22 would serve through war's end and beyond; the squadron would not disband until 1919, in Marburg.

Commanding officers (Staffelführer)
 Oberleutnant Erich Hönemanns: transferred in from Jasta 12 on 26 November 1916 – transferred out 29 June 1917
 Leutnant Alfred Lenz: transferred in from Jasta 4 on 1 July 1917 – served until war's end on 11 November 1918

Aerodromes
 
 Vaux, Laon: 16 November 1916 – 26 November 1916
 Riencourt, Arras: 26 November 1916 – 15 May 1917
 Mont, Verdun: 15 May 1917 – June 1917
 Vivaise, France: June 1917 – September 1917
 Mont, Verdun, France: September 1917 – November 1917
 Near Soissons, France: November 1917 – 19 March 1918
 La Ferté Ferme, France: 19 March 1918 – 23 March 1918
 Mont-d'Origny, France: 23 March 1918 – 29 March 1918
 Villeselve, France: 29 March 1918 – 8 April 1918
 Ercheu, France: 8 April 1918 – 12 May 1918
 Mont-Saint-Martin: 12 May 1918 – 8 July 1918
 Bignicourt, France: 11 July 1918 – 8 August 1918
 Haubourdin, France: 8 August 1918 – 19 August 1918
 Guise, France: 20 August 1918 – 11 November 1918

Notable members

 Karl Bohnenkamp: Military Merit Cross winner who scored 15 victories for the Jasta
 Josef Jacobs: Pour le Merite, Iron Cross awardee who went on to become Germany's fourth scoring ace of the war
 Dieter Collin: Iron Cross winner who went on to command Jasta 56
 Erich Thomas: Iron Cross winner whose specialty was balloon busting.

Aircraft

Original equipment at mobilization was nine Halberstadt D.II and two Albatros D.II fighters. The Jasta operated Albatros fighters until it gained Fokker D.VIIs in 1918. It had at least one Siemens-Schuckert D.IV during the closing days of the war, as Staffelführer Lenz used one to become an ace on 29 September 1918, and was delighted with the aircraft.

Operations

Jasta 22 was originally formed in the 7 Armee area. It is known to have supported that army until well into 1917. Jasta 22 fought until war's end, and disbanded in 1919.

References

Bibliography
 

22
Military units and formations established in 1916
1916 establishments in Germany
Military units and formations disestablished in 1918